The Door is an Albanian women's football club based in Shkodër. They compete in the Albanian women's football championship

References 

Football clubs in Albania
The Door